Angelspit is an electronic music band originally from Sydney, Australia, and currently based in Chicago, United States. The band was formed in 2004 by vocalists/synthesists Destroyx (Amelia Tan) and ZooG (Karl Learmont). The band's music combines stylistic elements of horror, punk, pop and electronic music. Their work contains imagery revolving around medical experiments and grotesque societies. Angelspit has toured with Angel Theory, Ayria, Ikon, KMFDM, Tankt and The Crüxshadows, and have also shared the stage with bands such as The Sisters of Mercy, Nitzer Ebb, Skinny Puppy and Front Line Assembly. They performed with Lords of Acid during a 22-date U.S. tour in March 2011 and toured the United States with Blood on the Dance Floor in October 2011.

History
Karl Learmont (ZooG) and Amelia Tan (Destroyx) met on an online zine forum. They shared an interest in zines and started the distro Vox Populis in 2002. They then started making zines for themselves which became the lyrical inspiration for releases to follow. Angelspit was formed in 2003, and the duo then self-released their debut EP, Nurse Grenade on 3 October 2004.

The band self-released their debut studio album, Krankhaus on 6 June 2006, and re-released it on 30 January 2007 with a bonus remix album, entitled Surgically Atoned, and in the US on Dancing Ferret Discs. The album featured remixes by Combichrist and Ego Likeness. A video for "Vena Cava" was released on 22 August 2007. The band toured Australia, the US and Europe where they lived in Berlin to record their second studio album, Blood Death Ivory.

The band released their second studio album, Blood Death Ivory on 11 June 2008. The album was written and recorded between 2006 and 2008. Again, the band continued to tour the new material around Europe and the USA. They released their debut remix album Black Kingdom Red Kingdom on 15 May 2009. Around this time the band began to produce "Blipverts", short video blogs and tutorials on various topics, including the production of the band's third studio album.

The band released their third studio album, Hideous and Perfect on 9 September 2009. A video for "Fuck the Revolution" was released on 28 September 2009. They released their second remix album Larva Pupa Tank Coffin on 10 October 2010. Larva Pupa Tank Coffin includes 4 brand new Angelspit tracks and remixes by the band themselves as well as other artists. A video for the remix of "Sleep Now" was released on 2 October 2010. They released their third remix album, Carbon Beauty on 8 March 2011. This new remix album contains 3 new tracks as well as 10 remixes of tracks from the Hideous and Perfect album. A video for "Toxic Girl" was released on 13 April 2011, and a video for "Like It? Lick It!" was released on 27 July 2011.

On 15 April 2011, Angelspit announced the addition of three new members: guitarist Valerie Gentile (Black Tape for a Blue Girl, The Crüxshadows), drummer Chris Kling (Hanzel und Gretyl, Mortiis) and videojammer The Liar. The new line-up of Angelspit released their fourth studio album, Hello My Name Is on 11 October 2011. Matt James replaced Chris Kling in early 2012, and former Crüxshadows guitarist George Bikos filled in for Valerie Gentile on the band's 2012 tour. On 23 March 2014, Angelspit announced DestroyX was taking time off to focus on her other projects and would be re-joining Angelspit on future recordings. She has now started a solo career under the name Amelia Arsenic.

Angelspit, now a four-piece led by ZooG (now known as Zoog Von Rock), has released two further albums - Cult of Fake in 2016 and Black Dog Bite in 2017 - while continuing to run their label Black Pill Red Pill. Zoog has also started a Patreon where he offers tips to aspiring musicians.

Band members

Current members 
 Zoog Von Rock  – vocals, programming 
 The Liar – video manipulation 
 Matt Slegel – guitars, bass guitar 
 Kitsu Noir – drums

Former members 
 Amelia Arsenic  – vocals 
 Chris Kling – drums 
 Valerie Gentile – guitars, bass guitar 
 George Bikos – guitars, bass guitar 
 Nick Delavega – programming, keyboards 
 AJ Gapsevic – guitars, bass guitar 
 Lorelei – vocals

Live contributors 
 Peter Crane – keyboards 
 Roberto Massaglia – keyboards 
 John Von Ahlen – engineer 
 Matt James – drums 
 Miss Ballistic – vocals 
 Dita von Cheats – synthesizer

Session musicians 
 Graeme Charles Kent – guitars, bass guitar 
 Bradley R. Bills – drums 
 Alex Weaver – vocals

Timeline

Discography

Studio albums

Live albums

Compilation albums

Remix albums

Extended plays

Singles

Video albums

Music videos

References

External links 

 

Australian electronic music groups
Electro-industrial music groups
Metropolis Records artists
Musical groups established in 2004
New South Wales musical groups